Metrodorinae is a subfamily of groundhoppers or pygmy grasshoppers. There are at least 90 genera and more than 590 described species, found in South America, Africa and Asia.

Genera

The Orthoptera Species File lists:

Tribe Amorphopini Günther, 1939
 Amorphopus Serville, 1838
 Eomorphopus Hancock, 1900
 Platythorus Morse, 1900

Tribe Cleostratini Hancock, 1907
 Cleostratus (insect) Stål, 1877 (Philippines)
 Indomiriatra Tinkham, 1939
 Metopomystrum Günther, 1939
 Miriatroides Zheng & Jiang, 2002
 Procytettix Bolívar, 1912
 Pseudomitraria Hancock, 1907
 Rhopalina Tinkham, 1939
 Rhynchotettix Hancock, 1907
 Rostella Hancock, 1913
 Spadotettix Hancock, 1910
 Thyrsus (insect) Bolívar, 1887

Tribe Clinophaestini Storozhenko, 2013
 Birmana Brunner von Wattenwyl, 1893
 Clinophaestus Storozhenko, 2013

Tribe Miriatrini Cadena-Castañeda & Cardona, 2015
 Miriatra Bolívar, 1906

Tribe Ophiotettigini Tumbrinck & Skejo, 2017
 Halmahera (insect) Storozhenko, 2016
 Ophiotettix Walker, 1871
 Paraspartolus Günther, 1939
 Rhopalotettix Hancock, 1910
 Spartolus (insect) Stål, 1877
 Threciscus Bolívar, 1887
 Uvarovithyrsus Storozhenko, 2016

Tribe Unassigned
 Allotettix Hancock, 1899
 Amphinotus Hancock, 1904
 Andriana (insect) Rehn, 1929
 Apterotettix Hancock, 1904
 Arexion (insect) Rehn, 1929
 Austrohyboella Rehn, 1952
 Bara (insect) Rehn, 1929
 Bolivaritettix Günther, 1939
 Bullaetettix Günther, 1937
 Calyptraeus Wang, 2001
 Camelotettix Hancock, 1907
 Centrosotettix Günther, 1939
 Charagotettix Brancsik, 1893
 Chiriquia Morse, 1900 (synonym Phelene Bolívar, 1906)
 Cingalina Hebard, 1932
 Cingalotettix Günther, 1939
 Cleostratoides Storozhenko, 2013
 Corystotettix Günther, 1939
 Cotys (insect) Bolívar, 1887
 Cotysoides Zheng & Jiang, 2000
 Crimisodes Hebard, 1932
 Crimisus Bolívar, 1887
 Cryptotettix Hancock, 1900
 Eurybiades (insect) Rehn, 1929
 Eurymorphopus Hancock, 1907
 Hildegardia (insect) Günther, 1974
 Holocerus Bolívar, 1887
 Hovacris Rehn, 1929
 Hybotettix Hancock, 1900
 Hyperyboella Günther, 1938
 Isandrus Rehn, 1929
 Lamellitettigodes Günther, 1939
 Macromotettix Günther, 1939
 Macromotettixoides Zheng, Wei & Jiang, 2005
 Mazarredia Bolívar, 1887
 Melainotettix Günther, 1939
 Metamazarredia Günther, 1939
 Metrodora (insect) Bolívar, 1887
 Moluccasia Rehn, 1948
 Myxohyboella Shishodia, 1991
 Notocerus Hancock, 1900
 Ocytettix Hancock, 1907
 Orthotettix Hancock, 1909
 Orthotettoides Zheng, 1998
 Otumba (insect) Morse, 1900
 Oxytettix Rehn, 1929
 Paraguelus Günther, 1939
 Plesiotettix Hancock, 1907
 Pseudoparatettix Günther, 1937
 Pseudoxistrella Liang, 1991
 Pterotettix Bolívar, 1887
 Salomonotettix Günther, 1939
 Scabrotettix Hancock, 1907
 Synalibas Günther, 1939
 Systolederus Bolívar, 1887
 Timoritettix Günther, 1971
 Trigonofemora Hancock, 1906
 Vaotettix Podgornaya, 1986

References

Further reading

 

Tetrigidae
Orthoptera subfamilies